A by-election was held for the New South Wales Legislative Assembly electorate of East Sydney, Australia on 14 April 1891 because of the death of John Street.

Dates

Result

John Street died.

See also
Electoral results for the district of East Sydney
List of New South Wales state by-elections

References

1891 elections in Australia
New South Wales state by-elections
1890s in New South Wales